Daniel Mark Nestor  (born September 4, 1972) is a Canadian former professional tennis player.

Nestor won 91 men's doubles titles (with 11 different partners), including an Olympic gold medal at the 2000 Sydney Olympics, four Tour Finals titles, and twelve major doubles titles attained with seven different partners (eight in men's doubles and four in mixed doubles). Nestor was the first man in history to win every major and Masters event, the Tour Finals, and an Olympic gold medal, an achievement since matched by the Bryan brothers. He was part of the ATP Doubles Team of the Year in 2002 and 2004 (with Mark Knowles), and 2008 (with Nenad Zimonjić). Nestor became the  world No. 1 doubles player for the first time in August 2002.

Nestor is widely considered one of the foremost doubles players in history, due to his longevity and continued success at the top of the game. , he is 10th for the most ATP Tour titles in Open Era history, and has the third-highest tally for doubles titles. In January 2016, Nestor became the first doubles player in ATP history to win 1000 matches. He was continuously ranked in the top 100 in doubles from April 1994 to April 2018, a total of 1134 consecutive weeks. Nestor retired at the end of the 2018 season, ending a 27-year career.

Tennis career
Nestor won his first doubles title in Bogotá, Colombia with Mark Knowles in 1994. They defeated French Open champions Luke and Murphy Jensen in the final.

He was a member of the Canadian Davis Cup team from 1992 to 2018. He first came to prominence in the public eye that year by defeating then world number one Stefan Edberg in a hard-fought singles match in Vancouver. He was part of the squad who made history for Canada in 2013 as they were the first Canadian team in the Open Era to reach the World Group semifinals.

At the 2000 Summer Olympics in Sydney, Australia, Nestor and partner Sébastien Lareau won a gold medal, the first and only medal so far in tennis for Canada. The duo won four more titles together during their career, which was highlighted by an ATP Masters 1000 win in Canada. After the Olympics, Nestor won one title with Kevin Ullyett in November 2000 and two with Sandon Stolle in 2001.

On July 5, 2006, he participated in the second-longest match in Wimbledon history, lasting 6 hours and 9 minutes.

Nestor won three Grand Slam doubles titles together with longtime partner Mark Knowles of the Bahamas. The tandem won the 2002 Australian Open, the 2004 US Open and the 2007 French Open. He and Knowles also reached the final of the 1995 Australian Open, the 1998 French Open and US Open, the 2002 French Open and Wimbledon and the 2003 Australian Open.

In mixed doubles, he reached his first final at the 2003 US Open with Lina Krasnoroutskaya. He made it to the 2006 Australian Open and 2006 French Open finals, as well as winning the mixed doubles event at the 2007 Australian Open with partner Elena Likhovtseva.

2007 was a year of change for Nestor. He and long-time doubles partner Knowles announced that they were parting ways after the 2007 US Open (the two won 40 titles together, including 3 Grand Slams, 1 ATP year-end finals, and 15 ATP Masters 1000 titles), as Nestor began a new partnership with Nenad Zimonjić. Nestor and Zimonjić had actually won an ATP World Tour 250 Series event together back in 2001. They won the first title of their official partnership at the 2007 St. Petersburg Open, then advanced to the 2007 Paris Masters final as the second seeds, where they lost to No. 1 doubles team Bob and Mike Bryan. Nestor and Knowles partnered once more at the 2007 Tennis Masters Cup after having qualified for the year-end event as the top seed. Their finals win over Simon Aspelin and Julian Knowle earned them their first Tennis Masters Cup title at the year-end doubles tournament, and was a fitting end for one of the most successful doubles teams to ever play the game.

Nestor had chosen to partner with Zimonjić because he felt as though the game had transformed into a more powerful and physical version of doubles. The New York Times reported that "on the tour, it's known that they (Nestor and Zimonjić) joined up, after years in the top 5 with other partners, specifically to usurp the Bryans." In 2008 (their first full season), Nestor and Zimonjić won the first major title of their partnership at the Hamburg Masters. They reached the final of the French Open a week later. Nestor and Zimonjić then captured the 2008 Wimbledon title, winning over Jonas Björkman and Kevin Ullyett. This was Nestor's first Wimbledon title, and in doing so, he completed a Career Grand/Golden Slam. The pair also captured the 2008 Tennis Masters Cup that year.

In 2009, the pair won Wimbledon again and eight additional titles, five of which were Masters 1000 events – personal bests for both in terms of numbers of Masters 1000 and overall titles won in a single year. In 2010, Nestor and Zimonjić won the French Open and were runners-up at the Australian Open. In October 2010, the duo announced that they would split up at the end of the 2010 season. However, they too, finished their partnership on a high note by winning the ATP World Tour Finals in London. Between 2008 and 2010, the duo won 21 ATP titles and reached 9 more finals. The pair won 27 titles together, which includes 3 Grand Slams, 2 ATP year-end finals, and 10 ATP Masters 1000 titles.

Nestor paired up with Max Mirnyi from 2011 to 2012. In his first tournament with Max Mirnyi in Brisbane, he won his 783rd career doubles match, overtaking Todd Woodbridge for the all-time match wins record. Nestor and Mirnyi won the 2011 French Open and the 2011 ATP World Tour Finals in London. In the final of the ATP World Tour Finals, he played his 1,148th match, an all-time record. Nestor won one more Grand Slam title with Mirnyi when they captured their second straight French Open in 2012. Nestor won a total of eight titles during his partnership with Mirnyi, which includes the 2 Grand Slams, 1 ATP year-end finals, and 1 ATP Masters 1000 title in Shanghai. Nestor won his second mixed doubles title at the 2011 Australian Open with Katarina Srebotnik.

Starting in January 2013, Nestor decided to partner with Mahesh Bhupathi. He however changed to play with Robert Lindstedt later during that year. In July, he won the 2013 Wimbledon mixed doubles title with Kristina Mladenovic and they also reached the 2013 French Open mixed doubles finals together. Nestor won his 81st doubles title, the Winston-Salem Open, in August with new partner Leander Paes. He also became the first player in ATP history to score 900 career doubles wins. With only one doubles title in 2013, it was the first year since 1999 in which Nestor failed to win four or more men's doubles titles, and the first year since 1995 in which Nestor failed to win two or more men's doubles titles. During the difficult year, he dropped out of the top 5 ATP rankings in June for the first time in 6 years, and ended the year 25th overall, his lowest doubles ranking since June 2000.

At the first tournament of his season, the 2014 Brisbane International, Nestor partnered with Mariusz Fyrstenberg and won his 82nd doubles title. Frysenberg was the 8th partner of Nestor's career with which he won a doubles title. However, at the end of 2013, he had decided to team with former partner Nenad Zimonjić for the 2014 season, and the next week at the 2014 Apia International Sydney, Zimonjić helped Nestor capture his second doubles title in as many weeks. Nestor captured his third Australian Open mixed doubles title, his second Grand Slam title with Mladenovic. He won his third doubles title of the season and 84th of his career at the 2014 Mutua Madrid Open, surpassing Todd Woodbridge for 3rd overall in ATP history. His first ATP Masters 1000 title since Shanghai in 2011 also brought his ATP ranking up to 7th overall, pushing him back in the top 10 for the first time in nearly a year. The next week, Nestor and Zimonjić won their second consecutive Masters 1000 title at the 2014 Internazionali BNL d'Italia, making 2014 the first year since 2009 that Nestor won multiple Masters 1000 titles. Despite a disappointing finish at the US Open, Nestor rose to number 3 overall and he and Zimonjic clinched a spot in the ATP Tour finals following the tournament.

In January 2015 at the Apia International Sydney, Nestor won his 86th doubles title, putting him in sole position of 11th overall for ATP titles in the Open era. This was Nestor's first title with new partner Rohan Bopanna, his 9th different partner. The same month, Nestor reached the mixed doubles final with Kristina Mladenovic at the Australian Open. He won his second doubles title of the season at the Dubai Tennis Championships in February. In August at the Cincinnati Masters, Nestor won his third title of the season and his first with new partner Édouard Roger-Vasselin.

In January 2016, Nestor and Radek Štěpánek became the oldest team to reach a Grand Slam men's doubles final at the Australian Open, losing in three sets to Jamie Murray and Bruno Soares. In June at the Aegon Open Nottingham, Nestor won his first title of the season with his 11th different partner Dominic Inglot, making it 23 consecutive years with at least one men's doubles title. He won his second doubles title in July at the Citi Open with Roger-Vasselin. While partnering again with Roger-Vasselin at the European Open in October, Nestor won his third title of the season and 91st overall.

On June 20, 2018, Nestor announced that he would retire in September 2018 after 28 career years. At the age of 46, he played his last professional match on September 15 at the Davis Cup World Group play-offs home tie against the Netherlands in Toronto partnering Vasek Pospisil, losing 6–4, 3–6, 4–6, 4–6 to Matwé Middelkoop and Jean-Julien Rojer.

Personal life
Born Danijel Nestorović, his Serbian parents moved to Canada short of his fourth birthday in 1976 and settled in Toronto, where he attended Elkhorn public school and then Earl Haig Secondary School for a special sports program known as APGA (Academic Program for Gifted Athletes).

In July 2005, Nestor married Nataša Gavrilović his girlfriend of two years. They welcomed their first daughter, Tiana Alexis, on December 15, 2008, only two weeks after his doubles partner Zimonjić and his wife had twins. Their second daughter, Bianca Willow, was born on March 2, 2013. The couple now resides in the Bahamas with their two children.

Nestor was appointed a Member of the Order of Canada (CM) in November 2010. On June 28, 2011, it was announced that Nestor would receive a star on Canada's Walk of Fame and was inducted on October 1 at Elgin Theatre in Toronto.
He was awarded an honorary doctorate by York University in August 2012.

Grand Slam finals

Doubles: 17 (8 titles, 9 runners-up)

Mixed doubles: 9 (4 titles, 5 runners-up)

Other significant finals

Year–End Championship finals

Doubles: 6 (4 titles, 2 runners-up)

Masters 1000 finals

Doubles: 47 (28 titles, 19 runners-up)

Olympic medal matches

Doubles: 2 (1 gold medal)

ATP career finals

Doubles: 151 (91 titles, 60 runners-up)

Performance timelines

Singles

Doubles

Mixed doubles

Partnerships

*Won titles with partners in bold

Awards
1997 – Tennis Canada male player of the year
2000 – Tennis Canada male player of the year
2001 – Tennis Canada male player of the year
2002 – ATP Doubles Team of the Year
2002 – ITF Doubles World Champion
2003 – Tennis Canada male player of the year
2004 – ATP Doubles Team of the Year
2004 – Tennis Canada male player of the year
2005 – Tennis Canada male player of the year
2007 – Tennis Canada male player of the year
2008 – ATP Doubles Team of the Year
2008 – ITF Doubles World Champion
2008 – Tennis Canada male player of the year
2009 – Tennis Canada male player of the year
2010 – Tennis Canada male player of the year
2012 – Davis Cup Commitment Award

Wins over top-10 players

See also

List of Canadian sports personalities

References

External links

1972 births
Living people
Canadian male tennis players
Canadian people of Serbian descent
Tennis players from Belgrade
Tennis players from Toronto
Serb diaspora sportspeople
Naturalized citizens of Canada
Yugoslav emigrants to Canada
Canadian expatriates in the Bahamas
Members of the Order of Canada
Australian Open (tennis) champions
French Open champions
Wimbledon champions
US Open (tennis) champions
Olympic gold medalists for Canada
Olympic tennis players of Canada
Grand Slam (tennis) champions in men's doubles
Grand Slam (tennis) champions in mixed doubles
Olympic medalists in tennis
Medalists at the 2000 Summer Olympics
Tennis players at the 1996 Summer Olympics
Tennis players at the 2000 Summer Olympics
Tennis players at the 2004 Summer Olympics
Tennis players at the 2008 Summer Olympics
Tennis players at the 2012 Summer Olympics
Tennis players at the 2016 Summer Olympics
ATP number 1 ranked doubles tennis players
ITF World Champions